Araiophos gracilis is a species of ray-finned fish in the genus Araiophos. It is found in the Pacific Ocean.

References 

Fish described in 1961
Sternoptychidae